The Brașov County Museum of History is a history museum in Brașov, Romania.

The museum, founded in 1950, is housed in the former Council House at the centre of Piața Sfatului, the main historic square of the city.

See also
 Museum of Urban Civilization
 Black Church

References

External links

 Official website 

1950 establishments in Romania
Museums established in 1950
History museums in Romania
Tourist attractions in Brașov
Buildings and structures in Brașov
Museums in Brașov County
Piața Sfatului